Kausa is a suburb of Mumbra in Thane District in the state of Maharashtra in India. It is administered by the Thane Municipal Corporation.

Kausa is considered as the planned part of mumbra With (TMC) complexes giving it the best infrastructure it also has (TMC) stadium and club house & 100 bed's government hospital.

Transport 
Kausa lies on the Old Mumbai Pune National Highway. It is connected to Navi Mumbai and Thane through buses operated by the Navi Mumbai Municipal Transport and Thane Municipal Transport respectively. In 2011, the Thane Municipal Corporation announced that it was planning to build a tunnel road to connect Mumbra and Kausa to Navi Mumbai via Airoli.

References 

Cities and towns in Thane district